The Fighting Chefs is a 2013 Philippine action comedy film directed by and starring Ronnie Ricketts and features celebrity chef Boy Logro in his feature film debut.  This was also Mark Gil's final film appearance until his death on September 1, 2014.

Synopsis
A group of chefs is divided into two fighting groups after learning they only have three months before they're all fired from their restaurant.

Cast

Ronnie Ricketts as Master Chef
Arci Muñoz
Mark Gil as Don Manolo (Friend of Master Chef)
Boy Logro
Dinky Doo
PJ Cuartero
Tiara Santos
Billy James Renacia
Hero Angeles as Ivan
Roldan Aquino
Hideaki Torio
Rey Bejar
Nadine Lustre
Jade Lopez
Jeffrey Santos
Gene Padilla
John Hall
Onyok Velasco
Joross Gamboa
Roi Vinzon as Daryl (as Villain Role and Don Manalo's arrogant brother)
Boy Roque as Daryl's man (as Villain Goon Role)
Bruce Ricketts
Roy Alvarez as Manager of Restaurant
DCoy
Beatriz
Natalia Moon
Ara Mina (cameo, as herself)
Cristina Sambrano
Shalala
Vandolph
Yoyong Martirez
Mariz Ricketts
Marella Ricketts
Vic Belaro as Policeman No. 1
Polly Cadsawan as Policeman No. 2 
Paolo Serrano as Cell Phone Snatcher

References

2013 films
Films about chefs
Philippine action comedy films